Gelechia aglossella is a moth of the family Gelechiidae. It is found in South Africa.

Adults are cinereous, the forewings slightly rounded at the tips and with speckles here and there clustering and forming four incomplete bands. The exterior border is slightly convex and very oblique. The hindwings are pale cinereous.

References

Endemic moths of South Africa
Moths described in 1866
Gelechia